Eelco Nicolaas van Kleffens (17 November 1894 – 17 June 1983) was a Dutch politician and diplomat.

Biography
Eelco van Kleffens descended from an old Frisian family of public servants. He was the son of Henricus Cato and Jeannette Frésine (Veenhoven) van Kleffens. His younger brother Adrianus van Kleffens would later become a judge at the European Court of Justice. He married Margaret Helen Horstmann on 4 April 1935.

After receiving a Doctor of Laws degree from Leiden University, van Kleffens worked in the Secretariat of the League of Nations. He became secretary to the Directorate of Royal Dutch Petroleum Co. in 1920. He was appointed Assistant Director of the Legal Section of the Netherlands Ministry of Foreign Affairs in 1922 and of the Diplomatic Section in 1927, becoming Director of the latter in 1929. In the early 1930s he was also Secretary-General of The Hague Academy of International Law.

Van Kleffens was appointed the Minister of Foreign Affairs in 1939, weeks before World War II began, and was part of the Dutch government in exile over that period. During the war he penned an account of the German invasion named Juggernaut over Holland which was circulated within the occupied territory, and he was also one of the original signatories of the Benelux union.

Van Kleffens held the position of foreign minister until the Schermerhorn/Drees cabinet of 1946. Following his resignation from the ministerial position (but not from the cabinet) van Kleffens became the Netherlands' representative on the United Nations Security Council, and in 1947 was appointed the ambassador to the United States. In 1950 he became the ambassador to Portugal, and was bestowed the title of Minister of State, a prestigious honour.

In 1954 van Kleffens was appointed to the position of President of the United Nations General Assembly for that body's ninth session.

Van Kleffens was the Dutch representative at NATO and the Organisation for Economic Co-operation and Development from 1956 to 1958, and at the European Coal and Steel Community from 1958 until 1967, after which Van Kleffens retired to Portugal, where he died on 17 June 1983.

Decorations

References

External links

Official
  Mr. E.N. (Eelco) van Kleffens Parlement & Politiek

1894 births
1983 deaths
Ambassadors of the Netherlands to Portugal
Ambassadors of the Netherlands to the United States
Commanders of the Order of the Netherlands Lion
Dutch jurists
Dutch expatriates in Belgium
Dutch expatriates in England
Dutch expatriates in the United States
Dutch people of World War II
Erasmus University Rotterdam alumni
Grand Officiers of the Légion d'honneur
Grand Crosses of the Order of Merit (Portugal)
The Hague Academy of International Law people
Independent politicians in the Netherlands
Knights Grand Cross of the Order of Orange-Nassau
Leiden University alumni
Ministers of Foreign Affairs of the Netherlands
Ministers of State (Netherlands)
Ministers without portfolio of the Netherlands
OECD officials
Organization for Security and Co-operation in Europe
People from Heerenveen
People from Sintra
Permanent Representatives of the Netherlands to NATO
Permanent Representatives of the Netherlands to the United Nations
Presidents of the United Nations General Assembly
Rectors of universities in the Netherlands
20th-century Dutch civil servants
20th-century Dutch diplomats
20th-century Dutch politicians